Mother, Mother, Mother Pin a Rose on Me is a film, produced by Out of the Inkwell Studios in the Phonofilm sound-on-film system, and released on March 1, 1925, as part of the Song Car-Tunes series.

The Fleischer brothers, Lee de Forest, Hugo Riesenfeld, and Edwin Miles Fadiman formed Red Seal Pictures to release the Song Car-Tunes series.

Early titles in the Song Car-Tunes series were Oh Mabel, Come Take A Trip in My Airship, and Goodbye My Lady Love, all released in May and June 1924. They were the first sound cartoons,  (predating Disney's Steamboat Willie (1928)). The Song Car-Tunes series eventually totaled 36 films, including 19 made in the Phonofilm sound system.

"Mother, Mother, Mother Pin a Rose on Me" is a popular song from 1905. The Fleischers re-released this film on July 6, 1929, as simply Mother, Pin a Rose on Me, part of their Screen Songs series, made in RCA Photophone, and released through Paramount Pictures.

References

External links
Mother, Mother, Mother Pin a Rose on Me (1926) at IMDB
SilentEra entry
Mother Pin a Rose on Me (1929 sound) at IMDB

1925 films
Fleischer Studios short films
American black-and-white films
1920s American animated films
Phonofilm short films
1925 animated films
Silent American comedy films
Short films directed by Dave Fleischer
American silent short films
1925 comedy films